The 2011–12 Women's LEN Trophy was the 13th edition of the competition.
 RN Imperia defeated Yugra Khanty-Mansiysk in the final by overcoming a home loss to become the fifth Italian club to win it.

Qualification round

Group A

 Olympiacos 28–6 Hannover, Uralochka 37–1 Järfälla
 Uralochka 46–8 Hannover, Lille 11–3 Järfälla
 Olympiacos 11–7 Lille, Hannover 13–12 Järfälla
 Olympiacos 30–1 Järfälla, Uralochka 21–4 Lille
 Olympiacos 12–7 Uralochka, Lille 6–5 Hannover

Group B

 Yugra 27–1 St. Bruno, Imperia 22–3 Senta
 Imperia 20–3 St. Bruno, Senta 10–7 Penguin
 Yugra 34–6 Senta, Imperia 24–6 Penguin
 Yugra 7–6 Imperia, St. Bruno 11–8 Penguin
 Yugra 30–1 Penguin, Senta 11–10 St. Bruno

Group C

 Plebiscito 16–8 Zaragoza, Patras 16–3 Otter
 Zaragoza 16–5 Hapoel, Patras 20–8 Hapoel
 Zaragoza 7–2 Otter, Zaragoza 12–9 Patras
 Plebiscito 24–3 Otter, Plebiscito 19–3 Hapoel
 Plebiscito 9–6 Patras, Otter 7–5 Hapoel

Preliminary round

Group A

 Fiorentina 14–7 Zaragoza
 Yugra 15–10 Zaragoza
 Yugra 11–8 Fiorentina
 Hannoverscher SV withdrew from competition

Group B

 Szentesi 25–5 Senta, Uralochka 16–7 Patras
 Szentesi 15–7 Patras, Uralochka 25–1 Senta
 Szentesi 6–5 Uralochka, Patras 12–8 Senta

Group C

 Olympiacos 12–12 SKIF, Imperia 23–2 Otter
 Olympiacos 33–1 Otter, Imperia 11–9 SKIF
 Olympiacos 10–9 Imperia, SKIF 37–3 Otter

Group D

 Plebiscito 22–2 St. Bruno, Leiden 14–6 Lille
 Plebiscito 10–8 Leiden, Lille 13–10 St. Bruno
 Plebiscito 11–3 Lille, Leiden 21–3 St. Bruno

Quarter-finals

Semifinals

Final

References

Women's LEN Trophy seasons
Women, Trophy
LEN Trophy women
LEN Trophy women
LEN
LEN